The Whitfield Estates–Lantana Avenue Historic District is a U.S. historic district located in Whitfield Estates, north of Sarasota, Florida. On March 8, 1997, it was added to the U.S. National Register of Historic Places.

This district is part of the Whitfield Estates Subdivision Multiple Property Submission.

References

External links

 Manatee County listings at National Register of Historic Places
 Florida Heritage Tourism Interactive Catalog: Whitfield Estates Lantana Avenue Historic District

National Register of Historic Places in Manatee County, Florida
Historic districts on the National Register of Historic Places in Florida